The Kenya women's national rugby union team are a national sporting side of Kenya, representing them at rugby union. The side first played in 2006.

History
Kenya were runners-up at the 2019 Rugby Africa Women's Cup which also doubled as a World Cup qualifying tournament. Despite their loss, the Lionesses still advanced to a cross-regional repechage play-off against Colombia. However, their last chances of qualifying were dashed with a narrow 15–16 loss to Colombia in Nairobi.

Results summary

(Full internationals only)

Players

2019 Elgon Cup Squad

References

External links
 Official website
 Rugby International

 
African national women's rugby union teams
 

fr:Équipe du Kenya de rugby à XV